Reverdin is a French surname. Notable people with this surname include:

 Jacques-Louis Reverdin, Swiss surgeon
 Louis Reverdin (b. 1894), phycologist with the standard author abbreviation 'Reverdin' 
 Mathieu Reverdin, French ice hockey player

References

French-language surnames